Carlos Jairsinho Gonzales Ávalos (born 20 December 1989) is a Peruvian footballer who currently plays for Pirata FC as a forward.

International career

Gonzales played his first international game with the senior national team on 6 August 2014 against Panama (3–0), after he came on as a substitute for Víctor Cedrón in the 54th minute of that game.

Honours
Alianza Lima
Copa Ciudad de Rosario (1): 2011
Copa Ciudad de Rosario melvin (1): 2011

References

External links
 
 

1989 births
Living people
Footballers from Lima
Peruvian footballers
Peru international footballers
Association football forwards
Club Alianza Lima footballers
Ayacucho FC footballers
Sporting Cristal footballers
Unión Comercio footballers
Sport Huancayo footballers
Deportivo Coopsol players
Peruvian Primera División players
Peruvian Segunda División players